The 1949 French Grand Prix was a Grand Prix motor race held at Reims on 17 July 1949. The race was won by Louis Chiron, who was driving a Talbot-Lago T26C.

Entries

Classification

Race

References

French Grand Prix
French Grand Prix
French Grand Prix
French Grand Prix